A supernova is an astronomical event, a type of stellar explosion.

Supernova or Super Nova may also refer to:

Astrophysics
Type Ia supernova
Type Ib and Ic supernovae
Type II supernova
Supernova impostor
Supernova remnant
Pair-instability supernova

Films and television
 Supernova, a film production company created by Oleg Mavromati
Supernova (2000 film), an MGM/UA science fiction film
Supernova (2005 film), a Hallmark Channel science fiction TV movie
Supernova (2020 film), a British drama film
2012: Supernova, an Asylum science fiction film
Supernova (British TV series), a BBC TV comedy series
Supernova (Latvian TV series), a singing competition show
Rock Star: Supernova, a U.S. reality TV series
Super Nova, the second TV movie from the science fiction show Lexx

Music

Bands
Supernova (American band), a pop/punk trio
Supernova (Chilean band), a pop band
Supernova (South Korean band), a boy band
Superknova, American queer pop artist

Albums
Supernova (Alice Nine album), 2014
Supernova (The Echoing Green album) or the title song, 2000
Supernova (Gonzalo Rubalcaba Trio album) or the title song, 2001
Supernova (Granrodeo album) or the title song, 2011
Supernova (Lisa Lopes album), 2001
Supernova (Nova Twins album), 2022
Supernova (Ray LaMontagne album) or the title song, 2014
Supernova (Supernova album), by the Chilean band, 1999
Supernova (Today Is the Day album), 1993
Super Nova (Wayne Shorter album) or the title song, 1969
Supernova, by Erdling, 2017
Supernova, by Exodus, 1981
Supernova, by Caitlyn Smith, 2020
Supernova, an EP by Lovestarrs, 2014

Songs
"Supernova" (Cir.Cuz song), 2012
"Supernova" (Liz Phair song), 1994
"Supernova" (Mr Hudson song), 2009
"Supernova"/"Karma", by Bump of Chicken, 2005
"Supernova", by Ansel Elgort, 2018
"Supernova", by Babou, 2014
"Supernova", by Dragonland from Astronomy, 2006
"Supernova", by Fear Factory from Transgression, 2005
"Supernova", by Jonas Blue from Blue, 2018
"Supernova", by Kylie Minogue from Disco, 2020
"Supernova", by Oomph! from Ego, 2001
"Super Nova", by Rocksteddy from Tsubtsatagilidakeyn, 2006
"Supernova", by Saves the Day from Saves the Day, 2013
"Supernova", by Underground Lovers from Dream It Down, 1994
"Supernova", by Within Temptation from Resist, 2019

Computing and computer games
Supernova (computer game), a text adventure game by Scott Miller
superNova (operating system), an operating system from ICL
Supernova (server), a server line under development at Sun Microsystems
Super Nova, the American name of Darius Force, a game in the Darius series
Super Nova (video game), a TRS-80 video game by Big Five Software
Supernova, a downloadable content pack in the Galaxy on Fire series

People
Super Nova (wrestler) (b. 1986), a Mexican professional wrestler
Mike Bucci or Super Nova (b. 1972), professional wrestler
Mike Segura or Super Nova (b.1969), professional wrestler

Other uses
Supernova (DC Comics), a superhero character in the DC Universe
Supernova (Marvel Comics), a supervillain character in the Marvel Universe
Supernova, a character in Rick and Morty
7712 Supernova, a new human battle machine in the Lego Exo-Force toy series
Benelli Supernova, a pump-action shotgun by Benelli
Dacia SupeRNova, a Romanian hatchback car
Epiphone Supernova, a discontinued Epiphone guitar
Novation Supernova, a synthesizer by Novation Digital Music Systems
Super Nova Racing, a Formula 3000, GP2 and A1 motor racing team
Hungarian Supernova or Megaminx, a dodecahedron-shaped puzzle similar to the Rubik's Cube
 Supernova, a novel by Marissa Meyer
 Supernova II, a space-based play-by-mail game

See also
Supanova Expo or Supanova Pop Culture Expo, also known simply as Supanova, a fan convention focusing on science fiction and fantasy film and TV, comic books, anime, gaming and collectables
Suprnova.org, a BitTorrent tracker